The 2011 Mission Queensland Firebirds season saw Queensland Firebirds compete in the 2011 ANZ Championship. With a team coached by Roselee Jencke, captained by Lauren Nourse and featuring Romelda Aiken, Laura Geitz, Clare McMeniman and Natalie Medhurst, Firebirds finished the season undefeated. They became the first team in the history of the ANZ Championship to go through the regular season and the playoffs without losing a single match. In the major semi-final, Firebirds defeated Waikato Bay of Plenty Magic and in the grand final they defeated Northern Mystics, winning their first premiership.  This marked the beginning of a golden age for Firebirds. Between 2011 and 2016, Jencke guided them to five grand finals and three premierships.

Players

Player movements

2011 roster

Notes
  Candice Adams, Jacqui Russell and Ameliaranne Wells were all members of the 2011 Queensland Fusion squad.

Gold medallists
Laura Geitz, Natalie Medhurst and  Chelsea Pitman were all members of the Australia team that won the gold medal at the 2011 World Netball Championships.

Pre-season
Firebirds won the tournament, defeating Pulse in the final. 
Final

Regular season

Fixtures and results
Round 1
Queensland Firebirds received a bye.
Round 2

Round 3

Round 4

Round 5

Round 6

Round 7

Round 8

Round 9

Round 10 

Round 11

Round 12

Final table

Playoffs

Statistics

Award winners

ANZ Championship awards

Australian Netball Awards

Firebirds awards

Notes
  Award shared with Leana de Bruin

References

Queensland Firebirds seasons
Queensland Firebirds